The Coney I-Lander restaurants are a regional chain based in Tulsa, Oklahoma.  Their signature dish is a small slow-grilled hot dog topped with chili,  onions, and mustard, sitting in a steamed bun. The restaurants also serve small tamales, and spaghetti topped with the same chili used on the coneys. The name of the restaurant is derived from Coney Island, the early-1900s amusement park and vacation destination in New York City.

The chain dates to 1926, when Greek immigrant Christ Economou opened his first location in downtown Tulsa.  The restaurant was one of the first to sell chili and was named "Coney Island in Tulsa" until 1983, a year in which the eateries sold more than 600,000 hot dogs.  At the downtown restaurant rows of "coneys" on the grill are visible to those standing outside on the sidewalk.  Antique school desks are used as seating at the original downtown location, a tradition started by the founder, who believed they offered each customer a personal space.

An oral history of the restaurant was given to Voices of Oklahoma in 2011 by the founder's son, Jim Economou.

References

External links 
 Coney I-Lander page (with photos) on roadfood.com
Voices of Oklahoma interview with Jim Economou. First person interview conducted on March 7, 2011, with Jim Economou, son of the founder of Coney I-Lander. 

Hot dog restaurants in the United States
Restaurants in Oklahoma
Restaurants established in 1926
Companies based in Tulsa, Oklahoma
1926 establishments in Oklahoma